Olympus Range is a primarily ice-free mountain range of Victoria Land, Antarctica, with peaks over , between Victoria and McKelvey Valleys on the north and Wright Valley on the south. It was mapped by the Victoria University of Wellington Antarctic Expedition, 1958–59, and named for the mythological home of the Greek gods. Peaks in the range are named for figures in Greek mythology.

Further reading
 I.B. Campbell, G.G.C. Claridge, Antarctica: Soils, Weathering Processes and Environment, PP 30 - 32
 Vivien Gornitz, Rising Seas: Past, Present, Future, P 64
 A.R. Lewis, D.R. Marchant, A.C. Ashworth, S.R. Hemming, M.L. Machlus, Major middle Miocene global climate change: Evidence from East Antarctica and the Transantarctic Mountains
 Adam R. Lewis, David R. Marchant, Allan C. Ashworth, Lars Hedenäs, Sidney R. Hemming, Jesse V. Johnson, Melanie J. Leng, Malka L. Machlus, Angela E. Newton, J. Ian Raine, Jane K. Willenbring, Mark Williams, and Alexander P. Wolfe, Mid-Miocene cooling and the extinction of tundra in continental Antarctica, PNAS August 5, 2008 105 (31) 10676–10680; https://doi.org/10.1073/pnas.0802501105
 Roger Highfield, Lost world frozen 14m years ago found in Antarctica, The Telegraph, Sunday 25 November 2018

Mountain ranges of Victoria Land
McMurdo Dry Valleys